Diz may refer to:

 Diz, Khvoresh Rostam, Iran, a village
 Diz, Shahrud, Iran, a village
 Adolfo Diz (1931–2008), Argentine economist
 Adrián Diz (born 1993), Cuban footballer
 Alejandro Diz (born 1965), Argentine former volleyball player
 Asier Etxaburu Diz (born 1994), Spanish footballer
 Facundo Diz (born 1979), Argentine footballer
 Pedro Diz (born 1944), Argentine former swimmer
 Diz Disley (1931–2010), Anglo-Canadian jazz guitarist
 Diz, Hakkari, a historical Assyrian tribe in Hakkari, Turkey
 FILE_ID.DIZ, a small text file stored in a ZIP

See also

 
 Dizzy (disambiguation)
 Dis (disambiguation)